Marie-José Kersaudy (born 27 February 1954) is a French former swimmer. She competed in four events at the 1968 Summer Olympics.

References

External links
 

1954 births
Living people
French female freestyle swimmers
Olympic swimmers of France
Swimmers at the 1968 Summer Olympics
Swimmers from Paris
20th-century French women